Geometric art is a phase of Greek art, characterized largely by geometric motifs in vase painting, that flourished towards the end of the Greek Dark Ages, . Its center was in Athens, and from there the style spread among the trading cities of the Aegean. The vases had various uses or purposes within Greek society, including, but not limited to, funerary vases and symposium vases.

Funerary context
Funerary vases not only depicted funerary scenes, but they also had practical purposes, either holding the ashes or being used as grave markers. Relatives of the deceased conducted burial rituals that included three parts: the prothesis (laying out of the body), the ekphora (funeral procession), and the interment of the body or cremated remains of the body.

To the Greeks, an omission of a proper burial was an insult to proper dignity. The mythological context of a proper burial relates to the Greeks' belief in a continued existence in the underworld that will disallow the dead to maintain peace in the absence of a proper burial ritual.

Aside from its funerary use, the Greeks also utilized various vessels during symposiums. The Greek symposium was a social gathering that only aristocratic males were allowed to attend. Vessels, such as wine coolers, jugs, various drinking cups, and mixing vessels, were decorated with Greek, geometric scenes. Some of the scenes depicted drinking parties or Dionysus and his followers. The symposia would be held in the “andron,” which was a man’s only room. The only women allowed into this room were called “hetaera,” or female sex-workers who required payment from their regular, male companions.

Pottery in Protogeometric and Geometric styles

Protogeometric period
During the Protogeometric period (1030–900 BC),  the shapes of the vessels have eliminated the fluid nature of the Mycenaean; creating a more strict and simple design. There are horizontal, decorative bands that feature geometric shapes, including, but not limited to, concentric circles or semicircles. Technological developments caused a new relationship between ornament and structure; causing differing stylistic choice from its Mycenaean influences. The Protogeometric period did not yet feature human figures within its art, but horses were pictured during this time period.

Common vase shapes of the period include amphorae with the handles on both the belly and the neck, hydriai (water jars), oinochoai (lit. wine jug), lekythoi, and skyphoi (stemless cups).

Early Geometric period
In the Early Geometric period (900–850 BC), the height of the vessels had been increased, while the decoration is limited around the neck down to the middle of the body of the vessel. The remaining surface is covered by a thin layer of clay, which during the firing takes a dark, shiny, metallic color. That was the period when the decorative theme of the meander was added to the pottery design, the most characteristic element of Geometric art.

During this period, a broader repertoire of vessel shapes was initiated. Specifically, amphorae were used to hold cremation ashes. The amphorae featured handles on the "neck/shoulder" for males, while they feature handles on the "belly" of the vase for women.

Middle Geometric period
By the Middle Geometric period (850–760 BC), the decorative zones appear multiplied due to the creation of a laced mesh, while the meander dominates and is placed in the most important area, in the metope, which is arranged between the handles.

Late Geometric period

Late Geometric period lasted from 750 to 700/650 BC. While the technique from the Middle Geometric period was still continued at the beginning of the 8th century BC, some potters enriched again the decorative organization of the vases, stabilized the forms of the animals in the areas of the neck and the base of the vase, and introduced between the handles, the human form. The Late Geometric Period was marked by a 1.62 meter amphora that was made by the Dipylon painter at around 760-750 BC. The vase was a grave marker to an aristocratic woman in the Dipylon cemetery. This was the first phase of the Late Geometric period (760–700 BC), in which the great vessels of Dipylon ware placed on the graves as funeral monuments, and represent with their height (often at a height of 1.50 m) and the perfection of their execution, the highest expression of the Greek Geometric art.

The focal point of the funerary vases (kraters) was now the body lying in state (prothesis) and the wail of the dead (Amphora in the National Archaeological Museum of Athens), carrying out to the grave with an honorary chariot race (Krater in the Athens National Archaeological Museum), and various other subjects thought to be related to similar descriptions of the Homeric epics.

People and animals are depicted geometrically in a dark glossy color, while the remaining vessel is covered by strict zones of meanders, crooked lines, circles, swastikas, in the same graphical concept. Later, the main tragic theme of the wail declined, the compositions eased, the geometric shapes have become more freely, and areas with animals, birds, scenes of shipwrecks, hunting scenes, themes from mythology or the Homeric epics led Geometric pottery into more naturalistic expressions.

One of the characteristic examples of the Late Geometric style is an oldest surviving signed work of a Greek potter Aristonothos (or Aristonophos) (7th century BC). The vase was found at Cerveteri in Italy and illustrates the blinding of Polyphemus by Odysseus and his companions. From the mid-8th century BC, the closer contact between Greece and the East enriched the ceramic art with new subjects – such as lions, panthers, imaginary beings, rosettes, palmettes, lotus flowers etc. – that led to the Orientalizing Period style, in which the pottery style of Corinth distinguished.

Narrative art
The notion of narrative during this time period exists between the artist and the audience. The artist communicates with the viewer, but the viewer’s interpretation can sometime be an inaccurate interpretation. Furthermore, multiple interpretations of a singular artwork can be created by the viewer. A combination of historical, mythological, and societal context is needed to interpret the stories told within Greek Geometric art. The artwork during the geometric period can be seen as "supplementary sources and illustrative materials for Greek mythology and Greek literature." The scenes that are depicted within Greek Geometric art contain various interpretations through analysis of the depicted scenes. Art historians must decide if the stylistic choices that were made during this time period were for a specific reason or simply coincidental.

Motifs

Vases in the Geometric style are characterized by several horizontal bands about the circumference covering the  entire vase. Between these lines the geometric artist used a number of other decorative motifs such as the zigzag, the triangle, the meander and the swastika. Besides abstract elements, painters of this era introduced stylized depictions of humans and animals which marks a significant departure from the earlier Protogeometric style. Many of the surviving objects of this period are funerary objects, a particularly important class of which are the amphorae that acted as grave markers for aristocratic graves, principally the Dipylon Amphora by the Dipylon Master who has been credited with a number of kraters and amphorae from the late geometric period.

Linear designs were the principal motif used in this period. The meander pattern was often placed in bands and used to frame the now larger panels of decoration. The areas most used for decoration by potters on shapes such as the amphorae and lekythoi were the neck and belly, which not only offered the greatest liberty for decoration but also emphasized the taller dimensions of the vessels.

The first human figures appeared around 770 BC on the handles of vases. The human forms are easily distinguished because they do not overlap with one another, making the painted black forms discernible from one another against the color of the clay body. The male was depicted with a triangular torso, an ovoid head with a blob for a nose and long cylindrical thighs and calves. Female figures were also abstract. Their long hair was depicted as a series of lines, as were their breasts, which appeared as strokes under the armpit.

Techniques
Two techniques of this time period include red-figure pottery and black-figure pottery. The black figure pottery started around 700 BC, and it remained the dominant style until its successor, red figure pottery, was invented around 530 BC. The switch from black figure pottery to red figure pottery was made due to the enhanced detail that red figured pottery allowed its artists.

See also

 List of Greek vase painters § Geometric period
 Mycenaean pottery
 Apulian pottery
 Orientalizing period
 Kerameikos Archaeological Museum

References

Further reading
Boardman, John. 2001. The History of Greek Vases: Potters, Painters, Pictures. New York: Thames & Hudson.
Cook, Robert Manuel, and Pierre Dupont. 1998. East Greek Pottery. London: Routledge.
 
Gjerstad, Einar, and Yves Calvet. 1977. Greek Geometric and Archaic Pottery Found In Cyprus. Stockholm: Svenska institutet i Athen.
Luke, Joanna. 2003. Ports of Trade, Al Mina and Geometric Greek Pottery In the Levant. Oxford: Archaeopress.

9th century BC in Greece
8th century BC in Greece
9th-century BC works
8th-century BC works
Ancient Greek vase-painting styles
Iron Age Greek art
Greek Dark Ages